The 2015–16 Oklahoma Sooners basketball team represented the University of Oklahoma in the 2015–16 NCAA Division I men's basketball season. The Sooners were led by Lon Kruger in his fifth season. They played their home games at the Lloyd Noble Center in Norman, Oklahoma as a member of the Big 12 Conference. They finished the season 29–8, 12–6 in Big 12 play to finish in third place. They defeated Iowa State in the quarterfinals of the Big 12 tournament to advance to the semifinals where they lost to West Virginia. They received an at-large bid to the NCAA tournament where they defeated Cal State Bakersfield, VCU, Texas A&M, and Oregon to be champions of the West Regional and earn a trip to the Final Four for the fifth time in school history. At the Final Four, they lost in the national semifinal to the eventual champion Villanova by 44 points, the largest margin in Final Four history.

Previous season
The Sooners finished the season 24–11, 12–6 in Big 12 play to finish in a tie for second place. They advanced to the semifinals of the Big 12 tournament where they lost to Iowa State. They received an at-large bid to the NCAA tournament where they defeated Albany in the second round and Dayton in the third round to advance to the Sweet Sixteen where they lost to Michigan State.

Departures

Incoming transfers

Recruits

Recruit class of 2016

Roster

Schedule

|-
! colspan=9 style="background:#960018; color:#FFFDD0;"| Exhibition

|-
! colspan=9 style="background:#960018; color:#FFFDD0;"| Regular season

|-
! colspan=9 style="background:#960018; color:#FFFDD0;"| Big 12 Tournament

|-
! colspan=9 style="background:#960018; color:#FFFDD0;"| NCAA tournament

x- Sooner Sports Television (SSTV) is aired locally on Fox Sports. However the contract allows games to air on various affiliates. Those affiliates are FSSW, FSSW+, FSOK, FSOK+, and FCS Atlantic, Central, and Pacific.

Rankings

*AP does not release post-NCAA tournament rankings

References

Oklahoma Sooners men's basketball seasons
Oklahoma
Oklahoma
NCAA Division I men's basketball tournament Final Four seasons